Local elections to Northumberland County Council, a county council in the north east of England, were held on 5 May 1977, resulting in a council with no party forming a majority.

Results

 
 

 Two Independent Conservative councillors were elected unopposed, hence received no votes.

References

External links
Northumberland County Council

1977
1977 English local elections
20th century in Northumberland